Mendl is a surname. Notable people with the surname include:

Charles Mendl (1871–1958), British diplomat and actor
Derek Mendl (1914–2001), Argentine cricketer
Hugh Mendl (1919–2008),  British record producer, A&R representative and manager
Jack Mendl (1911–2001), Argentine cricketer and educator
Michael Mendl (born 1944), German actor
Sigismund Mendl (1866–1945), British politician and businessman

See also 
Lady Mendl (c. 1859–1950), American actress and interior decorator
Mendel (disambiguation)